Banesareh (also Romanized as Bānesareh and Bān Sareh; also known as Bāsareh, Bonehsar, and Pānsareh) is a village in Shaban Rural District, in the Central District of Nahavand County, Hamadan Province, Iran. At the 2006 census, its population was 393, in 89 families.

References 

Populated places in Nahavand County